Macrocycles are often described as molecules and ions containing a ring of twelve or more atoms. Classical examples include the crown ethers, calixarenes, porphyrins, and cyclodextrins. Macrocycles describe a large, mature area of chemistry.

Synthesis 
The formation of macrocycles by ring-closure is called macrocylization. Pioneering work was reported for studies on terpenoid macrocycles. The central challenge to macrocyclization is that ring-closing reactions do not favor the formation of large rings. Instead, small rings or polymers tend to form. This kinetic problem can be addressed by using high-dilution reactions, whereby intramolecular processes are favored relative to polymerizations.  

Some macrocyclizations are favored using template reactions.  Templates are ions, molecules, surfaces etc. that bind and pre-organize compounds, guiding them toward formation of a particular ring size.  The crown ethers are often generated in the presence of an alkali metal cation, which organizes the condensing components by complexation. An illustrative macrocyclization is the synthesis of (−)-muscone from (+)-citronellal.  The 15-membered ring is generated by ring-closing metathesis.

Occurrence and applications
One important application are the many macrocyclic antibiotics, the macrolides, e.g. clarithromycin.  Many metallocofactors are bound to macrocyclic ligands, which include porphyrins, corrins, and chlorins.  These rings arise from multistep biosynthetic processes that also feature macrocycles.

Macrocycles often bind ions and facilitate ion transport across hydrophobic membranes and solvents.  The macrocycle envelops the ion with a hydrophobic sheath, which facilitates phase transfer properties. 

Macrocycles are often bioactive and could be useful for drug delivery.

Subdivisions 
 Cryptand
 Rotaxane 
 Catenane
 Molecular knot

Effective molarity
Macrocyclic stereocontrol

See also 

 Macrocyclic ligand

References

Further reading